Rustom O Sohrab or Rustam-Sohrab is an Urdu play by Agha Hashar Kashmiri. It was first published in 1929.

See also
Rustom Sohrab

References

Plays by Agha Hashar Kashmiri
1929 plays
Urdu-language plays
Works based on Shahnameh